Stockenström is a surname. Notable people with the surname include:

Andries Stockenström (1792–1864), Cape Colony army officer and politician
Andries Stockenström (judge) (1844–1880), Cape Colony judge 
Wilma Stockenström (born 1933), South African writer, translator, and actor

See also
Stockenström baronets